Aasiaat Airport  is an airport located in the Disko Bay,  northeast of Aasiaat, a town in the Qeqertalik municipality in western Greenland. It can serve STOL aircraft, although there is no aircraft deicing equipment at the airport, which is costly and problematic in Greenlandic winter.

Airlines and destinations

Air Greenland operates government contract flights to villages in the Aasiaat Archipelago. These mostly cargo flights are not featured in the timetable, although they can be pre-booked. Departure times for these flights as specified during booking are by definition approximate, with the settlement service optimized on the fly depending on local demand for a given day. Settlement flights in the Disko Bay region are unique in that they are operated only during winter and spring. During summer and autumn, communication between settlements is by sea only, serviced by the Diskoline ferry.

Ground transport
There is a road to Aasiaat, around  road distance to the town centre. Taxis are available.

References

Airports in Greenland
Airports in the Arctic
Disko Bay
Airports with year of establishment missing